Lennox Davidson Samuel (born 15 August 1979) is a British Virgin Islands cricketer. Samuel is a right-handed batsman who bowls right-arm off break.

In 2006, the British Virgin Islands were invited to take part in the 2006 Stanford 20/20, whose matches held official Twenty20 status. Samuel made a single appearance in the tournament against Saint Lucia in a preliminary round defeat, with him being dismissed opening the batting for 5 runs by Darren Sammy.  He also bowled three wicketless overs in the match. He later played for the team in its second appearance in the Stanford 20/20 in 2008, making a single appearance in a preliminary round defeat against Dominica, taking the wicket of Vincent Casimir to finish with figures of 1/27 from four overs, while with the bat he was dismissed for 17 runs by Liam Sebastien.

References

External links
Lennox Samuel at ESPNcricinfo
Lennox Samuel at CricketArchive

1979 births
Living people
British Virgin Islands cricketers